The United Moldova Party is a political party in Moldova.

History 
The party was formed on May 21, 2005 in Chişinău.

The "Moldova Unită" Party of Spiritual Development won 0.22% at April 2009 Moldovan parliamentary election.

In June 2009 decided to stand for July 2009 Moldovan parliamentary election on the ticket of the Social Democratic Party (Moldova) headed by Dumitru Braghiş.

In 2010, the group of MPs of the United Moldova Party comprised the five lawmakers who defected from the Communists Party at the end of 2009. These are: Vladimir Ţurcan, Victor Stepaniuc, Ludmila Belcencova, Svetlana Rusu and Valentin Guznac. Victor Stepaniuc defected from the United Moldova Party on September 9, 2010.

Notable people 
 Victor Stepaniuc 
 Anna Tcaci

References

External links
 Partidul “Moldova Unită — Единая Молдова” (PMUEM) 
 The Moldova Unită Party has decided to stand for parliament on the ticket of the SDP 
 Stepaniuc leaves United Moldova Party

Political parties in Moldova
Political parties established in 2005